Issa Boulos (born 1968) is a Palestinian-American Oud player, composer, lyricist, researcher and educator. Born in Jerusalem into a Christian family known for both music and literary traditions, his talent became evident at an early age, and was singing Arab classical maqam repertoire by age 7. He enrolled in the Institute of Fine Arts in Ramallah at age 13 and studied Oud with Abu Raw`hi 'Ibaidu.

Background
Ud player, composer, ethnomusicologist, and teacher Issa Boulos was born in Jerusalem, in 1968. Issa Boulos comes from a family of both musical and literary traditions and began to study voice at the age of 7. At that early age, Issa showed extraordinary talent in singing the Arab classical maqam repertoire. At the age of 13, he entered the Institute of Fine Arts in Ramallah to study the ‘ud with Abd al-Hamid ‘Ibaidu. His musical activities started during the mid-1980s through acting as an arranger and performer with local folk and contemporary groups. In 1986, he released Al-‘Ashiq with Sareyyet Ramallah Troupe for Music and Dance, followed by Rasif Al-Madinah in 1989 with composer/singer Jamil Al-Sayih. By the early 1990s, Issa was exploring Western music's principles of composition and orchestration, of which he incorporated various aspects into his own music. Those early years witnessed the composition of over 200 instrumental and vocal pieces and one large-scale extended work entitled Kawkab Akhar (Another Planet).

Subsequently, he was appointed director of Birzeit University's musical group Sanabil, in addition to training Al-Funoun Popular Dance Troupe and Sareyyet Ramallah Troupe for Music and Dance.

In the 1980s and 1990s Boulos broadened his artistic perspectives by splitting his time between Ramallah and Chicago. Eventually, he settled in Chicago in 1994 and enrolled in the music composition program at Columbia College Chicago where he studied music composition with Gustavo Leone and Athanasios Zervas and followed that up in the graduate program at Roosevelt University with Robert Lombardo and Ilya Levinson.
He founded the Issa Boulos Ensemble in 1998 while continuing to perform his original contemporary compositions that ranged from maqam compositions, chamber, orchestral, to jazz.
After completing his Master's degree in 2000, Boulos spent one year in his hometown, where he continued to be an active composer, educator, and 'udist. During that year, he took on the position of instructor of Western music theory and history, 'ud, chorus, ensemble, and theory of Arab music at the Edward Said National Conservatory of Music, Ramallah[8]. It was during this time that he established the Little Composer program, an educational program that is delivered through the medium of music. It is based on contemporary approaches used to encourage children to work as a team and as part of a larger group and write their own lyrics and set them to music.

Boulos's portfolio includes traditional Arab compositions and arrangements, jazz, and film and theater scores, notably those for Lysistrata 2000, Catharsis and the PBS documentary film The New Americans[19], and Nice Bombs[20]. In most of his orchestral compositions, Boulos incorporates the melodic material of maqam and some of the instruments associated with it such as the ‘ud, buzuq, baglama, qanun, nay, Turkish clarinet, santoor, and traditional percussion instruments. It was upon these achievements that he was commissioned to write original orchestral works for various renowned orchestras such as the Chicago Symphony Orchestra[21]. He is a recipient of many awards and fellowships including the 2006 and 2003 Artist Fellowship Award by the Illinois Arts Council, and the Norwegian Fund Award in 2006, the Palestinian Cultural Fund Award in 2006, the Arab Cultural Fund Award in 2010, and the A. J. Racy Fellowship for Ethnomusicological Music Studies	in 2013. He obtained his Ph.D. in ethnomusicology from Leiden University in 2020. The title of his dissertation is The Palestinian music-making experience in the West Bank, the 1920s to 1959: Nationalism, colonialism, and identity.

Notable works 
2010-2013        Streets 1, Streets 2, for orchestra, commission by the Palestine National Orchestra; performed in Syria, Palestine, Serbia, Austria, Croatia, Germany, Italy, Romania, Tunisia & Egypt.
2008        A Jerusalemite Love Song, for voice and orchestra; performed by The Palestine-Berlin Youth Orchestra in Lebanon, Jordan, Syria & Egypt.
2008        Raqs al-Janub, Manfa, for orchestra and qanun; performed by Euro Med Youth Orchestra in Syria, Palestine, Serbia, Austria, Croatia, Germany, Italy, Romania, Tunisia & Egypt.
2007        Manfa and Longa, for orchestra and qanun; performed by The Palestine-Berlin Youth Orchestra.
2006        Four orchestral pieces with mixed world music ensemble commissioned by the Chicago Symphony Orchestra (CSO); performed by the CSO in Chicago, & by other orchestras in Greece, Syria & Jordan.
2005         Nice Bombs, original music for independent documentary.
2003         New Americans, original music for PBS documentary.
2000         Shortly After Life, for orchestra.
2000         Tao, for violin & harp.
1999        Samar, twenty jazz pieces for, ‘ud, tambourine, guitar and clarinet.
1998        Sama, six pieces for string quartet & harp.
1998         Pastiche, for chamber orchestra.
1995         Naji, for piano and cello.
1993        Another Planet, original instrumental compositions.
1989        Side Street, original songs.
1986         al-Ashiq, Palestinian folk songs.

Discography
2019         Bonfire, original instrumental and vocal works for chamber mixed orchestra, Chicago.
2011         Little Composers, arranged children songs. Nawa Records, Jerusalem.
2010         Sunny and Breezy, original instrumental works. Nawa Records, Jerusalem.
2009         Being Peace, original songs. Nawa Records, Chicago.
2008         Meme Enchanted, arranged traditional songs for full ensemble. U of C, Chicago.
2008         Al-‘Hallaj, eight original songs for mixed Ensemble. Nawa Records, Chicago.
2007         Rif, original compositions for Turkish kemence. Nawa Records, Chicago.
2003         One World, One Language, original composition for Lingua Musica, Chicago.
1989         Side Street, original songs, Jerusalem.
1986         Al-‘Ashiq, Palestinian folk.

Notable recordings as significant ensemble member
2004        Boonie Ba-Boona, Assyrian Market Records, Chicago.
2002        Il y a un pays Palestine, Musique du monde, France.
2002        Ida y Vuelta. Flamenco, Sweet Pickle Music, Chicago.
2002        Songs for Swinging Sophisticates, Jazz, Sideways Entertainment, Chicago.

Notable radio and television appearances
2013    WBEZ, Chicago Public Radio, Worldview[9].
2010     BBC Oxford / interview and presentation.
2009     BBC Oxford / interview and presentation.
2009     Monte Carlo Paris / interview and presentation.
2008     NPR, National Public Radio / interview and presentation.
2007    WLUW, Loyola's Radio Station, with Peter Margasak / review.
2007    WLUW, Loyola's Radio Station / Chicago World Music Festival. 
2006    WLUW, Loyola's Radio Station / Arab Heritage Month[23].
2006    NPR, Prairie Home Companion (Garrison Keillor), interview and presentation[24].
2006     WTTW, Metromix, interview / Chicago World Music Festival.
2005    CBS, interview and presentation / Chicago Jazz Festival.
2004    ABC Chicago Radio, interview and presentation / Love Songs of the World.
2003     CLTV, Global Connections, Exploring the ‘Ud.
2001     Monte Carlo Ramallah / interview and presentation.

References

External links
 Issa Boulos
 Issa Boulos - Last.fm

1968 births
People from Jerusalem
American people of Palestinian descent
American male composers
21st-century American composers
Living people
Palestinian composers
21st-century American male musicians